The Xi baryons or cascade particles are a family of subatomic hadron particles which have the symbol  and may have an electric charge of +2 , +1 , 0, or −1 , where  is the elementary charge.

Like all conventional baryons,  particles contain three quarks.  baryons, in particular, contain either one up or one down quark and two other, more massive quarks. The two more massive quarks are any two of strange, charm, or bottom (doubles allowed).

They are historically called the cascade particles because of their unstable state; they are typically observed to decay rapidly into lighter particles, through a chain of decays (cascading decays). The first discovery of a charged Xi baryon was in cosmic ray experiments by the Manchester group in 1952. The first discovery of the neutral Xi particle was at Lawrence Berkeley Laboratory in 1959. It was also observed as a daughter product from the decay of the omega baryon observed at Brookhaven National Laboratory in 1964. The Xi spectrum is important to nonperturbative quantum chromodynamics (QCD), such as lattice QCD.

History
The  particle is also known as the cascade B particle and contains quarks from all three families. It was discovered by D0 and CDF experiments at Fermilab. The discovery was announced on 12 June 2007. It was the first known particle made of quarks from all three quark generations – namely, a down quark, a strange quark, and a bottom quark. The D0 and CDF collaborations reported the consistent masses of the new state.

For notation, the assumption is that the two heavy quarks are both strange, denoted by a simple  ; a subscript "c" is added for each constituent charm quark, and a "b" for each bottom quark.
Unless specified, the non-up/down quark content of Xi baryons is strange (i.e. there is one up or down quark and two strange quarks). However a  contains one up, one strange, and one bottom quark, while a  contains one up and two bottom quarks.

In 2012, the CMS experiment at the Large Hadron Collider detected a  baryon (reported mass ). (Here,"*" indicates a baryon decuplet.)

In 2017, the LHCb researchers reported yet another Xi baryon: the double charmed  baryon, consisting of two heavy charm quarks and one up quark.

List of Xi baryons
Isospin and spin values in parentheses have not been firmly established by experiments, but are predicted by the quark model and are consistent with the measurements.

Table notes

See also
 Delta baryon
 Hyperon
 Lambda baryon
 List of baryons
 List of mesons
 List of particles
 Nucleon
 Omega baryon
 Sigma baryon
 Timeline of particle discoveries

References

External links
 
 
 
 
 

Baryons
Nuclear physics